Notelaea pungens is a species of flowering plant in the olive family that is endemic to south-eastern Queensland, Australia.

References

pungens
Flora of Queensland
Lamiales of Australia
Plants described in 1987